Senator Wiggins may refer to:

Brice Wiggins (born 1971), Mississippi State Senate
Harry Wiggins (1932–2004), Missouri State Senate
Pat Wiggins (1940–2013), California State Senate